The fifth government of Israel was formed by Moshe Sharett during the second Knesset on 26 January 1954, and was the first government not led by David Ben-Gurion. Sharett kept the same coalition partners as during the fourth government, i.e. Mapai, the General Zionists, the Progressive Party, Mizrachi, Hapoel HaMizrachi, the Democratic List for Israeli Arabs, Progress and Work and Agriculture and Development.

The only changes to the previous government were Sharett taking over as PM, Pinhas Lavon as Minister of Defense, the addition of Zalman Aran as a Minister without Portfolio and the dropping of the two Mizrachi and Hapoel HaMizrachi Deputy Ministerial posts.

Ben-Gurion returned to the government in February 1955, replacing Lavon following the former's resignation over the Lavon Affair.

The government fell when Sharett resigned on 29 June 1955, when the General Zionists refused to abstain from voting on a motion of no-confidence brought by Herut and Maki over the government's position on the trial of Malkiel Gruenwald, who had accused Israel Kastzner of collaborating with the Nazis.

External links
Second Knesset: Government 5 Knesset website

 05
1954 establishments in Israel
1955 disestablishments in Israel
Cabinets established in 1954
Cabinets disestablished in 1955
1954 in Israeli politics
1955 in Israeli politics
 05